James Marie Hopper (July 23, 1876 – August 28, 1956) was an American writer and novelist. He was also an early college football player and coach, playing at the University of California, Berkeley in the late 1890s and then serving single seasons as head football coach at Nevada State University—now known as the University of Nevada, Reno—in 1900 and at his alma mater, California, in 1904. During his lifetime, Hopper published 450 short stories and six novels.

Early life, education, and college football career

Hopper was born on July 23, 1876, in Paris, France, to John Joseph Hopper, a native of Ireland, and his wife, Victoire Blanche Lefebvre. He attended schooling in Paris and later immigrated to the United States with his mother to California, where he completed his preliminary education.

Hopper graduated from the University of California, Berkeley with the class of 1898. While at Berkeley, he played football and first as an end and later at quarterback. He completed law school at the Hastings Law School. He passed the state bar examination but never practiced law. Instead he worked as a reporter on the San Francisco Chronicle, and was on the staff of The Wave, a literary San Francisco weekly.

In 1900, Hopper was hired to coach football at Nevada State University—now known as the University of Nevada, Reno. He led the 1900 Nevada State Sagebrushers football team to a record of 4–2–1 including a win over Stanford.

Hopper married Mattie E. Leonard on September 21, 1901, at the San Francisco residence of her father, Joseph E. Leonard, and mother. The coupled honeymooned to Southern California.

Writing career

After coaching at the University of California in 1904, Hopper was sent to the Philippines, by the McClure's magazine, to write a new book. When they returned to the United States, Hopper joined the McClure's staff in San Francisco. He then became a reporter for The San Francisco Call at the time of the 1906 San Francisco earthquake. He ended up staying there for two years to teach school.

In 1907, he and his wife moved to Carmel-by-the-Sea, California where his good friend, George Sterling, had established "Bohemia-by-the Sea". There he rented a house by the beach where he published stories that he hoped to sell to magazines. In Carmel many of his close associates were friends from his encounters at Coppa's “bohemian” restaurant in San Francisco, including: Harry Leon Wilson, Xavier Martinez, Arnold Genthe, painter Francis McComas and his wife Gene as well as Perry Newberry, Mary Hunter Austin, and Sinclair Lewis. He was also friends with writer Frederick R. Bechdolt. Together, they wrote the fictional novel 9009 about the condition of American prisons and the need for reform.

 

Hopper was close friends with novelist Jack London. In April 1907, London was aboard his boat, the Snark, when he held the sleeve of a football sweater with his wife Charmian, and Hopper. The London's were prepared to embark on a round-the-world cruise. London hoisted his old friend's jersey up the mast and flew it like a flag as the Snark sailed past the Golden Gate and out of San Francisco Bay.

When he left Carmel he returned to Oakland to write stories of his Philippine adventures for Sunset and other magazines.

Following his return to Carmel, Hopper built a home on the site that George Sterling had a home. He became a United States citizen in 1917. During World War I, he worked as a correspondent for Collier's magazine. At the end of the war, he became a full-time Carmel resident. He was active at the Forest Theater in Carmel. During the Great Depression in the United States, he served in the WPA's Federal Writers' Project as a state director and later as the northern regional director.

Death
Hopper died at his Carmel home on August 28, 1956, at age 80. Funeral services were held in Pacific Grove, California.

Head coaching record

Works

 The Proud Dig and the Lazy Student (1901) (short story published by A. M. Robertson)
 Caybigan (1906) (short stories)
 9009 (1908)
 The Trimming of Goosie (1909)
 The Freshman (1912)
 What Happened in the Night, and Other Stories (1913) (short stories)
 Coming Back With the Spitball, a Pitcher's Romance (1914)
 Medals Of Honor (1929) illus. John Alan Maxwell

Short works from magazines

References

External links

 
 
 
 

1876 births
1956 deaths
19th-century players of American football
20th-century American journalists
20th-century American novelists
American football ends
American football quarterbacks
California Golden Bears football coaches
California Golden Bears football players
Nevada Wolf Pack football coaches
San Francisco Chronicle people
University of California, Hastings College of the Law alumni
Sportspeople from Paris
Coaches of American football from California
Players of American football from California
French emigrants to the United States
French people of Irish descent
French players of American football